Schechter Institute of Jewish Studies, (Machon Schechter) located in the Neve Granot neighborhood of Jerusalem, is an Israeli academic institution.

History
Founded in 1984 by the Jewish Theological Seminary (N.Y.) and Israel's Masorti Movement as a rabbinical seminary known as "The Seminary of Judaic Studies," the Schechter Institute has been located since 1990 in Neve Granot, a neighborhood behind the Israel Museum.

Schechter is the only academic institution in Israel devoted entirely to Jewish studies and to fostering a pluralistic approach to Jewish-Israeli identity through education, the arts and community leadership.

The Schechter Institute has more than 600 students, 300 in the M.A. programs and 300 in non-degree studies, specializing in eight Jewish study tracks or programs including Judaism and the Arts, Gender and Feminist studies, Land of Israel, and classical Jewish disciplines such as Bible, Talmud, Midrash, and Jewish Thought. A new program, Meirav, is an inter-disciplinary program combining study of classical Jewish Textual Midrash, Talmud, Bible for an M.A. degree. Its Maccabbee Community Leadership M.A. program combines Jewish studies with practical tools for building strong community-based professional leadership. Its Mishlei M.A. program strengthens the connection between the academic study of Judaism and practical community works. Its Marpeh program, unique to Israel, combines Chaplaincy with a degree in Family and Community Studies.

The Schechter Institute has 49 full- and part-time faculty members and approximately 2,000 M.A. graduates. Many work in the Israeli school system as principals and teachers, in the Israel Ministry of Education in management positions, including curriculum planning, or in the nationwide Community Center Association.

Schechter Institute research centers include the Center for Women and Jewish Law, the Center for Judaism and the Arts, and the Center for Applied Jewish Law, and the Midrash Project which publish several books annually in diverse fields of Jewish studies. Schechter also co-publishes Nashim, the Journal of Jewish Women’s Studies, in partnership with Brandeis University and Indiana University Press.

The Schechter campus in Jerusalem, in addition to its graduate school, is home to the Schechter Rabbinical Seminary for ordination of rabbis, TALI Education Fund and Midreshet Schechter. The Schechter Institute also operates Neve Schechter, the Center for Contemporary Jewish Culture in the historic former Cafe Lorenz building in Tel Aviv's Neve Tzedek neighborhood. The Schechter Institute's Midreshet Schechter Ukraine helps operate Jewish Community Centers, with Masorti Olami, in the Ukraine

Notable faculty
 David Golinkin, Talmud and Jewish Law
 Moshe Benovitz, Talmud and Jewish Law
 Shamma Friedman, Talmud

See also
Education in Israel
Religion in Israel

References

External links
 Official website (in English)
 Official website (in Hebrew)

Educational institutions established in 1984
Jewish studies research institutes
Conservative Judaism in Israel
Judaism in Jerusalem
Jewish seminaries
Jews and Judaism in Tel Aviv
Conservative yeshivas
1984 establishments in Israel